Unilateral nevoid telangiectasia presents with fine thread veins, typically over a segment of skin supplied by a particular nerve
on one side of the body. It most frequently involves the trigeminal and C3 and C4 or adjacent areas.

The condition was named in 1970 by Victor Selmanowitz.

See also 
 Skin lesion
 List of cutaneous conditions

References

External links 

Dermal and subcutaneous growths
Vascular-related cutaneous conditions